Events from the year 1999 in art.

Events
28 May – After 22 years of restoration work, Leonardo da Vinci's The Last Supper is placed back on display in Milan, Italy.
July – After 158 years of an empty plinth, Mark Wallinger's Ecce Homo becomes the first work displayed on the Fourth plinth, Trafalgar Square, London.
11 December – After 19 years of work, restoration of the Sistine Chapel frescoes is completed in the Vatican City.
The Stuckism movement is founded by Billy Childish and Charles Thomson.
Discovery of Venus of Tan-Tan (300,000–500,000 BP) in Morocco, the earliest known artefact to show evidence of human artistic input.

Exhibitions
11 March – Jackson Pollock retrospective opens at the Tate London.

Works

Louise Bourgeois – Maman
Maurizio Cattelan – La Nona Ora (sculpture)
Mike Chapman – Christ Child (sculpture, London)
Fern Cunningham - "Harriet Tubman Memorial - Step on Board" (sculptural tableaux, Boston)
Tracey Emin – My Bed (exhibited at Tate Gallery, London)
Antony Gormley – Quantum Cloud (sculpture, London)
Andreas Gursky – color photographs
99 Cent II Diptychon (diptych)
Rhein II
Friedensreich Hundertwasser - The Hundertwasser Toilets (architectural sculpture in Kawakawa, New Zealand)
Anish Kapoor – Taratantara (Baltic Flour Mill, Gateshead)
Cornelia Parker – Hanging Fire (Suspected Arson) (installation)
Beverly Pepper – Persephone Unbound (bronze, Seattle)
Neo Rauch – Tal

Awards
Archibald Prize – Euan MacLeod, Self portrait/head like a hole
John Moores Painting Prize - Michael Raedecker for  "Mirage"
Schock Prize in Visual Arts – Jacques Herzog and Pierre de Meuron
Turner Prize – Steve McQueen
-The Venice Biennial-
The Lion d'or (Golden Lion) for Lifetime Achievement: Louise Bourgeois (USA), Bruce Nauman (USA)
The Lion d'or for Best Pavilion: Monica Bonvicini, Bruna Esposito, Luisa Lambri, Paola Pivi, Grazia Toderi (Italy)

Deaths

January to June
28 January – Markey Robinson, Irish painter (born 1918)
5 February – Nicholas Krushenick, American pop art painter (born 1929)
9 February – Richard Allen, American Minimalist, Abstract, Systems, Fundamental and Geometric painter (born 1933)
18 February – Andreas Feininger, French-born American photographer (born 1906)
10 March – Oswaldo Guayasamín, Ecuadorian painter and sculptor (born 1919)
15 March – Harry Callahan, American photographer (born 1912)
20 March – Patrick Heron, English painter, writer and designer (born 1920)
24 March – Ladjane Bandeira, Brazilian artist and journalist (born 1927)
29 March – Lucien Aigner, Hungarian photographer (born 1901)
24 April – Arthur Boyd, Australian painter and sculptor (born 1920)
2 May – Tibor Kalman, Hungarian-American graphic designer (born 1949)
12 May – Saul Steinberg, Romanian-born American cartoonist and illustrator (born 1914)
15 June – John Glashan, Scottish cartoonist, illustrator and playwright (born 1927)
19 June – Oton Gliha, Croatian painter (born 1914)
30 June – Edouard Boubat, French photographer (born 1923)

July to December
5 July – Thea Tewi, German-born American sculptor and lingerie designer (born 1902)
14 July – Władysław Hasior, Polish sculptor, painter and set designer (born 1928)
15 August – Hugh Casson, British architect, interior designer, artist, writer and broadcaster (born 1910)
21 August – Leo Castelli, Italian-American art dealer and gallerist (born 1907)
22 August – Yann Goulet, French sculptor, Breton nationalist and war-time collaborationist with Nazi Germany (born 1914)
30 August – Raymond Poïvet, French cartoonist (born 1910)
13 September – Miriam Davenport, American painter and sculptor (born 1915)
4 October – Bernard Buffet, French painter (born 1928)
23 October - Albert Tucker, Australian Expressionist painter (born 1914) 
27 October – Charlotte Perriand, French architect and designer (born 1903)
4 November – Richard Clements, Australian painter (born 1951)
18 November
Stephen Greene American painter (born 1917)
Horst P. Horst, German American photographer (born 1906)
12 December – Paul Cadmus, American painter (born 1904)
28 December – Louis Féraud, French fashion designer and artist (born 1921)

References

 
 
1990s in art
Years of the 20th century in art